The Whirlpool River is a short river in Jasper National Park, Alberta, Canada. It is an early tributary of the Athabasca River.

The Whirlpool is formed in Athabasca Pass, collecting meltwater from the Hooker Icefield and the Mount Brown Icefield.  It flows north, collecting the Middle Whirlpool River before passing under Alberta Highway 93A and flowing into the Athabasca River south of Jasper.  The Moab Lake Road parallels the Whirlpool near its confluence with the Athabasca River.

The Whirlpool was named by Sir James Hector in 1859.  He noted the presence of many eddies in the river.

Tributaries
Scott Creek
Ross Cox Creek
Middle Whirlpool River
Divergence Creek
Simon Creek

See also
List of Alberta rivers

References

Rivers of Alberta
Rivers of the Canadian Rockies